Kaseem Ryan (born August 11, 1972), better known by his stage name Ka, is an American rapper, producer, and firefighter from Brownsville, Brooklyn, New York City, New York. His solo work has met critical acclaim and he is often noted for his focused concept albums and lyricism.

He is a former member of the group Natural Elements. In 1995 he formed the group Nightbreed with his friend Kev. In 2008, he was re-introduced on GZA's album Pro Tools on the song "Firehouse" and in that same year he released his debut album Iron Works. In 2012, he released the follow-up Grief Pedigree on his label Iron Works. The album featured a guest appearance by Roc Marciano and was produced by Ka.

In an August 2016 New York Post story, Ka was identified as a Brooklyn-based FDNY fire captain. The article focuses on his "double life as a hip-hop artist whose songs are peppered with the N-word, drugs, violence and anti-cop lyrics." In a 2013 interview Ka discussed being a firefighter, saying "I have a full time job and I work all the time. I try to keep that kinda low. I just have a job. It ain't my calling or nothing. It's just my job."

Discography

Solo albums

Collaborative albums

EPs

References

External links 
 

1972 births
American male rappers
Living people
Rappers from Brooklyn
Underground rappers
American firefighters
People from Brownsville, Brooklyn
21st-century American rappers
21st-century American male musicians